The Anti-War Committee of Russia is an organization founded by a group of exiled Russian public figures for the purpose of opposing Vladimir Putin's regime and the 2022 Russian invasion of Ukraine. Through its Ark project, the committee helps coordinate resources for emigrants leaving Russia as a result of the war.

Founding 
The Anti-War Committee was established on February 27, 2022, by a group of exiled Russian public figures. Its goal was declared to be the fight against the rule of Vladimir Putin, which it says is responsible for the war in Ukraine, and which the committee describes as a "dictatorship." The Moscow Times noted the significance of the committee's coordinated effort as a departure from the infighting more typical among opposition parties in Russia. Prominent committee members include CEO Mikhail Khodorkovsky of Yukos, former Prime Minister Mikhail Kasyanov, former World Chess Champion Garry Kasparov, economists Sergei Aleksashenko and Sergei Guriev, historian Vladimir Kara-Murza, Russian Academy of Sciences member Yuri Pivovarov, politician Dmitry Gudkov, entrepreneurs Boris Zimin and Evgeny Chichvarkin, writer Viktor Shenderovich and journalist Yevgeny Kiselyov. The organization uses the white-blue-white flag and a peace sign in the colors of the Ukrainian flag as symbols on its website.

Goals 
The committee called on the governments of all countries to "take a firm stand against those who violate international law." In addition, it calls on "true Russian patriots" to "consolidate themselves in the fight against the aggressive dictatorship of Vladimir Putin - regardless of any political differences, ideological divergences and personal sympathies and antipathies."

Initiatives and activities 
The committee has issued appeals to general audiences such as Western countries as well as to specific groups such as the members of United Russia, the largest political party in Russia. On March 4, the committee published a direct appeal to Russians two days ahead of planned protests in Moscow. The group has also appealed directly to Sergey Brin, a member of the Alphabet Inc. Board of Directors.

The Anti-War Committee operates the Ark project as a support resource for Russians who have chosen to emigrate as a result of the war. Through this project, the committee is able to help Russian emigrants find housing and set up bank accounts among other forms of assistance. It is coordinated in part with volunteers located in Yerevan and Istanbul but is able to offer legal assistance in other locations as well. The committee says that monetary donations collected as part of its Sunrise initiative will help supply humanitarian aid in the form of food, medicine, clothing, and hygiene items for people living in Ukraine during the war.

References

General references 

 

2022 establishments in Russia
Opposition to Vladimir Putin
Organizations established in 2022
Peace organizations
Reactions to the 2022 Russian invasion of Ukraine